Sinopanorpa is a genus of scorpionflies.

Species
 Sinopanorpa digitiformis Huang & Hua in Cai, Huang & Hua, 2008 
 Sinopanorpa nangongshana Cai & Hua in Cai, Huang & Hua, 2008
 Sinopanorpa tincta (Navás, 1931)

References

Panorpidae